Sibu Island is an island group in Mersing District, Johor, Malaysia.

History
The area was declared as a marine park in 1993.

Geography
It consists of several islands, namely Sibu Besar Island, Sibu Tengah Island, Sibu Kukus Island and Sibu Hujung Island. There are four main beaches on the eastern side of Sibu. Sibu Besar, the main island, is approximately 6 km long and 1 km wide, and for the most part covered by tropical vegetation.

Geology
The island mostly consists of pyroclastic rock with ashy characteristics.

Demographics
On the southern end of Sibu Besar Island, there is a small fishing village called Kampong Duku with a population of fewer than a hundred people (about 40 families).

Activities
The main leisure activities on the island are watersports such as snorkelling and diving, and numerous coral reefs are close to hand. Most of the beach resorts are located on the eastern side of the main island. Sea Gypsy Village Resort and Dive Base and Sibu Island Cabanas are situated on a beach facing Tinggi Island. Other resorts, such as Rimba Resort, are on the opposite side. Resorts facing the mainland are MYVilla Farmstay, Coconut Village Resort, Junansa Villa and Twin Beach Resort. Most of the resorts are closed during the annual 3-month monsoon period, save for those facing the mainland.

Transportation
The island is accessible by ferry from Tanjong Leman Jetty in Mersing Town.

See also
 List of islands of Malaysia

References

External links

 
 Tourism Malaysia - Sibu Island

Islands of Johor
Mersing District